Humphrey George Maurice Broun-Lindsay (23 October 1888 – 23 June 1964) was Unionist Party (Scotland) MP for Glasgow Partick (UK Parliament constituency) from 1924 to 1929.

He was sometimes simply known as George Lindsay.  He served as a major in the army.

References

External links 

1888 births
1964 deaths
Members of the Parliament of the United Kingdom for Glasgow constituencies
Unionist Party (Scotland) MPs
UK MPs 1924–1929
British Army personnel of World War I
Companions of the Distinguished Service Order
King's Own Scottish Borderers officers
People educated at Cheltenham College
Members of the Royal Company of Archers
Deputy Lieutenants of East Lothian
People from East Lothian